Esra Erol (born 6 November 1985) is a Turkish female  footballer currently playing in the Turkish First League in defender position for Beşiktaş with jersey number 23 in Istanbul. She was also a member of the Turkish national team.

Club career 

Following a successful season in the Sakarya based Yenikent Güneşspor, the club extended Esra Erol's contract for one more season in July 2008, and tasked her with captain position. She captained Lüleburgaz Düvenciler Lisesispor and after its renaming Lüleburgaz 39 Spor. In August 2012, she transferred from Lüleburgaz 39 Spor, where she was also the team captain, to Konak Belediyespor.

She played with Konak Belediyespor at the 2013–14 UEFA Women's Champions League in the qualification round matches in August 2013 and in the knockout stage matches in October 2013.

For the 2015–16 season, she signed with Kireçburnu Spor, which was recently promoted to the Women's First League.

In August 2016, she returned to her former club Konak Belediyespor, and played in three matches of the Group 9 of the 2016–17 UEFA Women's Champions League qualifying round, where she netted one goal. She capped in three games of the 2017–18 UEFA Women's Champions League qualifying round and scored one goal.

Erol returned to Istanbul and signed with Ataşehir Belediyespor before the 2017–18 league champion club's participation at the 2018–19 UEFA Women's Champions League qualifying round. She played in all three matches of the qualification round. In the 2018–19 league season, she transferred to Beşiktaş J.K. She enjoyed the champion title of her team in the 2018–19 season. She took part at the 2019–20 UEFA Women's Champions League - Group 9 matches.

International career 

Erol scored a winner over Northern Ireland in the Euro 2009 qualifying. She is also the owner of four goals scored in friendly matches against Bulgarian, Russian and Greek national women.

She played at the UEFA Women's Euro 2017 qualifying Group 5 matches as the captain of the Turkey women's national.

Career statistics 
.

Honours 
 Turkish Women's First League
 Konak Belediyespor
 Winners (4): 2012–13, 2013–14, 2014–15, 2016–17
 Third places (1): 2017–18

 Beşiktaş J.K.
 Winners (2): 2018–19, 2020–21

References

External links 
Esra Erol at UEFA
Esra Erol at Turkish Football Federation

1985 births
Living people
People from Bakırköy
Footballers from Istanbul
Turkish women's footballers
Women's association football defenders
Turkey women's international footballers
Lüleburgaz 39 Spor players
Konak Belediyespor players
Kireçburnu Spor players
Ataşehir Belediyespor players
Beşiktaş J.K. women's football players
Turkish Women's Football Super League players